Rokas Baciuška (born 10 December 1999) is a professional rally driver from Lithuania. He has won the Lithuania Kart racing championship, the European Rallycross Championship in the Super1600 class, and the World Rally-Raid Championship in the T4 SSV class.

Racing Career

Early career 

Rokas Baciuška started kart racing. at the age of 7. Multiple victories, including the winning of a national title, inspired him to pursue a professional motorsport career. Since then, R. Baciuška has competed in several motorsport disciplines, including rally, rallycross, and rally raid.

Rallycross 

Rokas Baciuška competed in the 2018 FIA European Rallycross Championship season, and won Super1600 class title on his first attempt.

Rally raid 

At the age of 22 Rokas debuted in 2022 Dakar Rally as the youngest Lithuanian ever to participate in the Dakar rally. Rokas took 3rd place overall in T4 category, and was nominated as a Best rookie. 

The 2022 Dakar Rally was the first round of inaugural 2022 World Rally-Raid Championship. Rokas completed the season by taking four podiums, winning 2022 Rallye du Maroc, and winning the championship title in T4 category.  

His results in 2022 gained him a spot in Red Bull Can-Am Team for the 2023 Dakar Rally. He finished 2nd in the 2023 Dakar Rally in the T4 category, winning 3 stages and leading at the start of the final day. However, he lost the rally in a cruel manner, losing around twenty minutes due to a broken suspension arm, which needed replacement. The time loss was enough for him to drop down to 2nd place in the general standings.

Racing record 

 2010 Lithuanian Karting Championship: 1st place in Rotax Junior class
 2012 WSK Euro Series - 60 Mini: 10th place
 2012 2012 23° Trofeo Andrea Margutti - 60 Junior Trophy: 4th place
 2014 25° Trofeo Andrea Margutti - KFJ: 9th place
 2015 Andrea Margutti Trophy - KF: 8th place
 2015 WSK Champions Cup - KF: 10th place
 2017 2017 CIK-FIA European KZ2 Championship: 7th place
 2019 German Kart Championship DSKM: 1st place
 2019 24° South Garda Winter Cup - KZ2: 6th place
 2018 FIA European Rallycross Championship: 1st place in Super1600 class
 2019 FIA World Rallycross Championship: 11th place
 2021 Rallye du Maroc: 5th place
 2021 Andalucia Rally: 4th place
 2021 Baja Aragon: 4th in T4 category
 2022 Dakar Rally: 3rd place in T4 class
 2022 Abu Dhabi Desert Challenge: 2nd place
 2022 Rallye du Maroc: 1st place in T4 category
 2022 Andalucía Rally: 2nd place in T4 category
 2022 W2RC championship: 1st place in T4 class 
 2023 Dakar Rally: 2nd place in T4 class category

Achievements and Nominations 

 Multiple Lithuanian and Baltic States Karting champion
 Twice nominated as Lithuania best racing driver of the year - 2018 and 2019
 European Super1600 RX champion at first attempt - 2018
 First Lithuanian to participate in World RX Championship - 2019
 Abu Dhabi Desert Challenge: 2nd place - 2022
 Rallye du Maroc: 1st place in T4 category - 2022
 Andalucía Rally: 2nd place - 2022
 Dakar Rally: 3rd place in T4 category - 2022
 Dakar Rally: Best Rookie - 2022
 Dakar Rally: youngest Lithuanian to participate in series (22 years old)
 Dakar Rally: s10 and s12 stage winner - 2022 
 Dakar Rally: 2nd place in T4 category - 2023
 Dakar Rally: Prologue, s5, s7 and s11 stage winner - 2023

Racing record

Dakar Rally results

Complete World Rally-Raid Championship results
(key)

* Season still in progress

References

External links
 
 
 Driver profile on Dakar.com

1999 births
Living people
Lithuanian racing drivers
European Rallycross Championship drivers
Dakar Rally drivers